Kyle Flanagan (born December 30, 1988) is an American former professional ice hockey player. He appeared in the American Hockey League (AHL) with the Adirondack Phantoms, Binghamton Senators and the Belleville Senators.

Playing career
Flanagan played college hockey with the St. Lawrence Saints in the NCAA Men's Division I ECAC Hockey conference. In his senior year, Flanagan's outstanding play was rewarded with a selection to the 2012–13 ECAC All-Conference First Team. He signed a one-year entry level contract with the Philadelphia Flyers on March 21, 2013.

On August 1, 2014, Flanagan signed his first European contract as a free agent in agreeing to a one-year deal with Modo Hockey of the Swedish Hockey League. In his tenure abroad, Flanagan featured in 38 games with Modo, registering 4 goals and 15 points as the club missed the post-season and narrowly avoided relegation in the 2014–15 season.

On September 22, 2015, Flanagan accepted an invitation to the Stockton Heat training camp, and was later signed by ECHL affiliate, making a professional return to Adirondack with the Thunder. After appearing in 44 games with the Binghamton Senators, Flanagan signed a two-year AHL contract on July 26, 2016.

After completing his contract with the Belleville Senators following the 2017–18 season, Flanagan opted to end his 6-year professional playing career, announcing his retirement on August 22, 2018.

Career statistics

Awards and honors

References

External links 

1988 births
Adirondack Phantoms players
Adirondack Thunder players
Belleville Senators players
Binghamton Senators players
Cedar Rapids RoughRiders players
Ice hockey players from New York (state)
Living people
Modo Hockey players
People from Canton, New York
St. Lawrence Saints men's ice hockey players
American men's ice hockey centers
AHCA Division I men's ice hockey All-Americans